Children’s Literature is an academic journal and annual publication of the Modern Language Association and the Children’s Literature Association Division on Children's Literature. The journal was founded in 1972 by Francelia Butler and promotes a scholarly approach to the study of children’s literature by printing theoretical articles and essays, as well as book reviews. The publication is currently edited by Amanda Cockrell, of Hollins University in Roanoke, Virginia. The current editor in chief is R. H. W. Dillard.

Children's Literature is published annually in May by the Johns Hopkins University Press. Each issue has an average length of 300 pages.

See also

Children’s literature criticism
Children’s literature periodicals

External links 
 
Children’s Literature on the Hollins University website
Children’s Literature on the JHU Press website
Children’s Literature  at Project MUSE

Children's literature criticism
Literary magazines published in the United States
Publications established in 1972
Annual journals
English-language journals
Johns Hopkins University Press academic journals